Thiên mệnh anh hùng (天命英雄), known as Blood Letter and Sword of the Assassin in English, is a 2012 Vietnamese martial arts action fantasy directed by Victor Vu,  produced by Phuong Nam Films and Saiga Films, in association with BHD.  One of the most expensive Vietnamese films ever made, Blood Letter is considered the first film of its kind, Kiem Hiep (Sword fighter Adventures) in Vietnam.  It was released theatrically in Vietnam on January 20, 2012 by Megastar Media. The film was going to be the official submission for Vietnam to the 86th Academy Awards for Best Foreign Language Film. However, on 19 September 2013, the National Cinema Department announced that the film did not meet the AMPAS criteria for distribution.

Synopsis
Adapted from a popular novel Bức Huyết Thư by Bùi Anh Tấn, based on the life of Nguyễn Anh Vũ, a Royal court officer during the era of Emperor Lê Thánh Tông. The film begins with a young boy arriving at the shore of a remote monastery. The boy grows up under the care and martial arts tutelage of the lone monk who cares for the temple.  Twelve years later, Nguyen Vu discovers his true identity, that he is the lone descendant of the nobleman Nguyễn Trãi, who was beheaded, along with the rest of his family, when he was implicated in the death of the King. Two eunuchs from the Royal Court learn the truth and when they try to escape are hunted down. One of the eunuchs writes his testimony in blood before he dies and this Blood Letter disappears. Nguyen Vu then embarks on a quest to find this letter so that he may clear his grandfather's name. Along the way he meets two sisters who are also on a quest to carry out vengeance against the Royal Court.

Cast
 Huynh Dong as Nguyen Vu
 Midu as Hoa Xuan
 Van Trang as Empress Dowager Tuyên Từ
 Khuong Ngoc as Tran Tuong Quan
 Van Anh as Lê Nghi Dân, Prince of Lạng Sơn
 Minh Thuan as Su Phu
 Jaivee Mai The Hiep as Le Dai Nhan

References

External links
 

2012 films
2010s fantasy action films
Films directed by Victor Vu
Vietnamese action films
Vietnamese fantasy films
Vietnamese martial arts films
2012 martial arts films
Films based on works by Vietnamese writers
Films set in the 15th century
Films set in the Lê dynasty
Vietnamese mythology in popular culture
Vietnamese-language films